The Kingdom of Sine (also: Sin, Siine or Siin in the Serer-Sine language) was a post-classical Serer kingdom along the north bank of the Saloum River delta in modern Senegal. The inhabitants are called Siin-Siin or Sine-Sine (a Serer plural form or Serer-demonym, e.g. Bawol-Bawol and Saloum-Saloum / Saluum-Saluum, inhabitants of Baol and Saloum respectively).

History

Medieval to 19th century

 
According to the historian David Galvan, "The oral historical record, written accounts by early Arab and European explorers, and physical anthropological evidence suggest that the various Serer peoples migrated south from the Futa Tooro region (Senegal River valley) beginning around the eleventh century, when Islam first came across the Sahara." Over generations these people, possibly Pulaar speaking herders originally, migrated through Wolof areas and entered the Siin and Saluum river valleys. This lengthy period of Wolof-Serer contact has left us unsure of the origins of shared "terminology, institutions, political structures, and practices."

Professor Étienne Van de Walle gave a slightly later date, writing that "The formation of the Sereer ethnicity goes back to the thirteenth century, when a group came from the Senegal River valley in the north fleeing Islam, and near Niakhar met another group of Mandinka origin, called the Gelwar, who were coming from the southeast (Gravrand 1983). The actual Sereer ethnic group is a mixture of the two groups, and this may explain their complex bilinear kinship system".

Historian Professor Eunice A. Charles of Boston University posits that:

"About 1520 the two Sereer states to the south, Siin and Saalum, were able to throw off Jolof' s control, and the mid-sixteenth-century revolt of Kajoor marked the end of the empire. The battle of Danki [ca. 1549], vividly remembered by griots of both Jolof and Kajoor, completed the shift from political unity to a Senegambian balance of power. Bawol and Waalo followed Kajoor's example, and, although Jolof tried several times in the late sixteenth and early seventeenth centuries to reconquer Kajoor, none of its attempts was successful."

The actual foundation of the Kingdom of Sine is unclear, but in the late 14th century Mandinka migrants entered the area. They were led by a matrilinial clan known as the Gelwaar. Here they encountered the Serer, who had already established a system of lamanic authorities, and established a Gelwaar led state with its capital in or near a Serer lamanic estate centred at Mbissel.

Father Henry Gravrand reports an oral tradition that one Maad a Sinig Maysa Wali Jaxateh Manneh (many variations: Maysa Wali Jon; Maissa Wali Jon; etc.), fleeing with his family from Kaabu following  a battle in 1335 which he calls The Battle of Troubang, was granted asylum by the Serer nobility of Sine .

Charles Becker notes that Gravrand had not recognised that this is actually a description of the 1867 (or 1865) Battle of Kansala although he agrees that the migration of the Guelowar can probably be explained by a war or a conflict of succession.
Serer oral history says that after Maysa Wali assimilated into Serer culture and served as legal advisor to the laman council of electors, he was chosen by the lamans and people to rule. Almost a decade later he elected the legendary Ndiadiane Ndiaye (many variations: Njaajaan Njie or N'Diadian N'Diaye)and founder of the Jolof Empire to rule the Kingdom of Jolof. He was the first Senegambian king to voluntarily gave his allegiance to Ndiadiane Ndiaye and asked others to do so,  thereby making Sine a vassal of the Jolof Empire. It is for this reason that scholars propose the Jolof Empire was not an empire founded by conquest but by voluntary confederacy of various states.
Around early 1550, both Sine  and its sister Serer Kingdom (the Kingdom of Saloum) overthrew the Jolof and became independent Kingdoms.  Serer oral tradition says that the Kingdom of Sine never paid tribute to Ndiadiane Ndiaye nor any of his descendants and that the Jolof Empire never subjugated the Kingdom of Sine and Ndiadiane Ndiaye himself received his name from the mouth of Maysa Waly. The historian Sylviane Diouf states that "Each vassal kingdom—Walo, Takrur, Kayor, Baol, Sine, Salum, Wuli, and Niani—recognized the hegemony of Jolof and paid tribute."

The rulers of Sine as well as Jolof continued to follow the Traditional African religion.  On 18 July 1867, the Muslim cleric Maba Diakhou Bâ was killed at The Battle of Fandane-Thiouthioune (also known as The Battle of Somb) by the King of Sine Maad a Sinig Kumba Ndoffene Famak Joof while he was trying to take control of Sine and make it a Muslim land.
The rulers of Sine retained their titles (Maad a Sinig) throughout the colonial period and did not lose all official recognition until 1969 after the death of Maad a Sinig Mahecor Joof (the last King of Sine, reigned: 1924 – 1969).

Portuguese explorers in the 15th century referred to Sine as the kingdom of Barbaçim, a corruption of 'Bur-ba-Sine' (Wolof for 'King of Sine'), and its people as Barbacins (a term frequently extended by early writers to Serer people generally,  while others insisted that Serreos and Barbacins were completely distinct peoples.)  Old European maps frequently denote the Saloum River as the "River of  Barbacins/Barbecins". 
It has now been acknowledged that the terms "Serreos" (Sereri) and "Barbacini" (a corruption of Wolof "Bur-ba-Sine") were actually a corruption by Alvise Cadamosto – the 15th-century navigator.  Alvise mistakenly distinguished between the "Sereri" (Serer people) and the "Barbacini", which seems to indicate that he was referring to two different people when in fact, the Kingdom of Sine was a Serer Kingdom where the "King of Sine" ("Barbacini") took residence.  Since he had never set foot in Serer country, his accounts about the Serer people were mainly based on what his Wolof interpreters were telling him.  "Barbacini" is a corruption of the Wolof phrase "Buur ba Sine" (also spelt: "Bor-ba-Sine" or "Bur-ba-Sine") meaning King of Sine,  a phrase the Serers would not use.

Economy
The economic base of Sine was agriculture and fishing. Millet and other crops were grown. Sine was very reluctant to grow groundnut for the French market, in spite of French colonial directives. It was less dependent on groundnut than other states. Deeply rooted in Serer conservatism and Serer religion, for several decades during the 19th century, the Serer farmers refused to grow it or when they did, they ensured that their farming cycle was not only limited to groundnut production.  Their religious philosophy of preserving the ecosystem affected groundnut production in Sine. Even after mass production was later adopted, succession struggles in the late 19th century between the royal houses hampered production. However, the Kingdom of Sine was less susceptible to hunger and indebtedness, a legacy which continued right up to the last king of Sine – Maad a Sinig Mahecor Joof.  It was very common for people from other states to migrate to the Serer kingdoms of Sine and Saloum in search of a better life. The inhabitants of Sine (the "Sine-Sine") rarely migrated.

Social organisation

Some of the king's government (or the political structure of Sine) include: the Lamanes (provincial chiefs and title holders, not to be confused with the ancient Serer Lamanes); the heir apparents such as the Buumi, Thilas and Loul (in that order); the Great Farba Kaba (chief of the army); the Farba Binda (minister of finance, the police and the royal palace) and the Great Jaraff (the king's advisor and head of the noble council of electors responsible for electing the kings from the royal family).

Political structure of Sine
The following diagram gives a condensed version of the political structure of Sine.
Political structure of Sine

             .....................................................Maad a Sinig 
             │                                                   (King of Sine) 
             │                                                           │
             │                                                           │
      ___│__                                             │
      │Heir apparents      │                                             │
      ││                                 ┌───────────┴───────────────────────────────────────┐
             │                                               │                          │                        │
           Buumi                                             │                          │                        │
             │                                       │_             │               _│
           Thilas                                    │Central hierarchy   │             │               │Territorial     │
             │                                       ││             │               │commands        │
           Loul                                              │                          │               │(The title      │
                                                             │                          │               │ holders)       │
                                                             │                 _│__     ││
                                                             │                 │Royal entourage   │               │
                                                             │                 │__│               │     
                                                             │                          │                         │
                        _│                          │                       Lamane
            ┌───────────┴───────────────────────────────────────┐                       │                    (Title holders 
            │               │                │                  │                    ___│                   and landed gentry)
     Great Jaraff           │                │               Lingeer                 │
 (Head of the noble council │           Farba mbinda      (Queen regnant. Head of    │
            and             │     (Minister of finance)    the female court)         │
      Prime Minister)       │                                            ┌───────────┴────────────────────────────────────────┐  
                            │                                            │                                                    │
                    Great Farba Kaba                                    Kevel                                             Family
                   (Chief of the army)                               (or Bour Geweel.
                                                       The griot of the king. He was very powerful 
                                                            and influential. Usually very rich)

See also
Serer people
Kingdom of Saloum
Biffeche
History of Senegal

Notes

References 
Sarr, Alioune. Histoire du Sine-Saloum. Introduction, bibliographie et Notes par Charles Becker, BIFAN, Tome 46, Serie B, n° 3–4, 1986–1987
Ngom, Biram (comprising notes of Babacar Sédikh Diouf): "La question Gelwaar et l’histoire du Siin", Université de Dakar, Dakar, 1987
 Martin A. Klein, Islam and Imperialism in Senegal Sine-Saloum, 1847–1914, Edinburgh University Press (1968)
Diouf, Niokhobaye. Chronique du royaume du Sine. Suivie de notes sur les traditions orales et les sources écrites concernant le royaume du Sine par Charles Becker et Victor Martin. (1972). Bulletin de l'Ifan, Tome 34, Série B, n° 4, (1972)
Diop, Cheikh Anta & Modum, Egbuna P. Towards the African renaissance: essays in African culture & development, 1946–1960
Gravrand, Henry: La Civilisation Sereer – Pangool. Published by Les Nouvelles Editions Africaines du Senegal. 1990. .
Henri Gravrand, La Civilisation Sereer: Cosaan, Les Origines, Nouvelles Editions africaines, (Dakar) 1983. 
Almada, André Alvares (1594) Tratado breve dos Rios de Guiné do Cabo-Verde: desde o Rio do Sanagá até aos baixos de Sant' Anna 1841 edition, Porto: Typographia Commercial Portuense. online
West Africa, Issues 3600–3616. West Africa Pub. Co. Ltd., 1986
Clark, Andrew F. & Phillips, Lucie Colvin. Historical Dictionary of Senegal, Second Edition Published as No. 65 of African Historical Dictionaries, (Metuchen, New Jersey: The Scarecrow Press, 1994) p. 246–247
Diouf, Mahawa. Ethiopiques n°54. Revue semestrielle de culture négro-Africaine. Nouvelle série volume 7. 2e semestre 199.
 Teixera da Mota, Avelino (1946) "A descoberta da Guiné", Boletim cultural da Guiné Portuguesa, P. 1 in Vol. 1, No. 1 (Jan), p. 11–68.
Boulègue, Jean. Le Grand Jolof, (XVIIIe – XVIe Siècle). (Paris, Edition Façades), Karthala (1987), p 16.
Research in African literatures, Volume 37. University of Texas at Austin. African and Afro-American Studies and Research Center, University of Texas at Austin, p 8. African and Afro-American Studies and Research Center, University of Texas (at Austin) (2006)
Becker, Charles, Vestiges historiques, témoins matériels du passé dans les pays sereer, CNRS-ORSTOM, Dakar, 1993
Taal, Ebou Momar, Senegambian Ethnic Groups: Common Origins and Cultural Affinities Factors and Forces of National Unity, Peace and Stability. 2010
Foltz, William J., From French West Africa to the Mali Federation, Volume 12 of Yale studies in political science, p136. Yale University Press, 1965

Serer history
Serer country
History of Senegal
History of the Gambia
Kingdoms of Senegal
Countries in precolonial Africa
Serer precolonial kingdoms
Sahelian kingdoms
Precolonial kingdoms of the Gambia